Penjamo or The Guys from Penjamo is a 1953 Mexican musical comedy film directed by Juan Bustillo Oro and starring Joaquín Pardavé, Rosario Granados and Ángel Infante.

Cast
 Joaquín Pardavé as Tío Porfirio  
 Rosario Granados as Carmela  
 Ángel Infante as Enrique  
 Agustín Isunza as Faramento (firulais) 
 Lupe Inclán as Pancha  
 Esther Luquín as Amelia  
 Armando Velasco as Doctor Robles  
 José Muñoz as Don Santiago  
 José Funes 
 Maricruz Olivier as Martha Jiménez 
 Leonor Gómez as Invitada al baile  
 Pedro Infante as Cantante  
 Pepe Nava as Empleado 
 José Pardavé as Invitado al baile 
 Humberto Rodríguez as Ponciano, mayordomo 
 Ramón Sánchez as Margarito
 Hernán Vera as Cantinero

References

Bibliography 
 Rogelio Agrasánchez. Carteles de la época de oro del cine mexicano. Archivo Fílmico Agrasánchez, 1997.

External links 
 

1953 films
1953 musical comedy films
Mexican musical comedy films
1950s Spanish-language films
Films directed by Juan Bustillo Oro
Mexican black-and-white films
1950s Mexican films